Ampandoantraka is a city in Anosibe An'ala District, Alaotra-Mangoro Region, Madagascar with a population of 10.669 inhabitants

References

Populated places in Alaotra-Mangoro